Edgardo Roque (born February 11, 1938) is a Filipino former basketball player who competed in the 1960 Summer Olympics.

Roque made it to six Philippine national teams: 1962 Asian Games in Jakarta; 1963, 1965-1967 Asian Basketball Confederation tournaments in Taipei, Kuala Lumpur and Seoul; 1960 Rome Olympics and 1964 Tokyo Olympics. He was an alternate in the 1968 Mexico Olympics.

In 1956, Roque was asked to try out for the Jose Rizal College basketball team and in the following year, he was donning the Heavy Bomber uniform. His stint with JRC was short because he transferred to Ysmael Steel and stayed with the Admirals until 1963. He joined the YCO Painters until 1970 and then went to Mariwasa before retiring in 1974.

References

External links
 

1938 births
Living people
Basketball players from Bulacan
Olympic basketball players of the Philippines
Basketball players at the 1960 Summer Olympics
Asian Games medalists in basketball
Basketball players at the 1962 Asian Games
Philippines men's national basketball team players
Filipino men's basketball players
Asian Games gold medalists for the Philippines
Medalists at the 1962 Asian Games
JRU Heavy Bombers basketball players